The totoaba or totuava (Totoaba macdonaldi) is a species of marine fish, a very large member of the drum family Sciaenidae that is endemic to the Gulf of California in Mexico. It is the only species in the genus Totoaba. Formerly abundant and subject to an intensive fishery, the totoaba has become rare, and is listed by the Convention on International Trade in Endangered Species of Wild Fauna and Flora under Appendix I. It is also listed by the International Union for Conservation of Nature as vulnerable, by NatureServe as critically imperiled and under the U.S. Endangered Species Act as endangered.

Life cycle
The totoabas' diet consists of finned fish and crustaceans. Individuals may live up to 15 years, but sexual maturity is usually not reached until the fish are 6–7 years old. As totoabas spawn only once a year, population growth is slow, with a minimum population doubling time of 4.5 to 15 years. The totoaba spawn in the Colorado River Delta, which also serves as a nursery for the young fish.

The totoaba population is found in two distinct groups. Larval and juvenile stages occupy the Colorado delta, while the adult breeding population lives for most of the year in deeper water towards the middle of the Gulf of California. The adult population migrates to the Colorado delta in April and May to spawn. One-year-old totoabas are metabolically most efficient in brackish water of about 20 parts per thousand (ppt) salinity, a level that occurred naturally in the delta before the diversion of water from the river that occurred in the middle of the 20th century.

Threats
The diversion of water from the Colorado River within the United States leaves little or no fresh water to reach the delta, greatly altering the environment in the delta, and the salinity of the upper Sea of Cortez. The flow of fresh water to the mouth of the Colorado since the completion of the Hoover and Glen Canyon dams has been only about 4% of the average flow during the period from 1910 to 1920. This is considered to be a major cause of the depletion of the totoaba population.  With the loss of the freshwater flow from the river, salinity in the delta is usually 35 ppt or higher.

Poaching
Another threat to the totoaba is from human poaching: the swim bladder is a valuable commodity, as it is considered a delicacy in Chinese cuisine; the meat is also sought-after for making soups. It can fetch high prices – 200 bladders may be sold for $3.6 million at 2013 prices – as it is erroneously believed by many Chinese to be a treatment for fertility, circulatory, and skin problems. The swim bladders are often smuggled to Hong Kong where they are illegal, but import screenings are lax, and from there they are sometimes forwarded to the Chinese mainland where import screenings are stricter. This trade once focused on the Chinese bahaba, but as its population became depleted, the trade shifted to the related totoaba. The illegal totoaba fishery also threatens the vaquita, a critically endangered porpoise endemic to the northern Gulf of California that appears to be doomed to extinction unless the setting of gillnets in its habitat can be halted.

Conservation
It has been illegal to catch totoaba since 1975 when it was placed on the Mexican Endangered Species List. In 1976 it was added to CITES Appendix I and in 1979 it was placed on the US Endangered Species List.

On 16 April 2015, Enrique Peña Nieto, the President of Mexico, announced a program of rescue and conservation of the vaquita and the totoaba, including closures and financial support to fishermen in the area. This closure is necessary as they were still caught as a bycatch in the legal fishery for other species. Some commentators believe the measures fall short of what is needed to save the vaquita.

The Chinese trade in totoaba swim bladders has been a primary reason for its decline. Despite being illegal, this trade often happened quite openly and traders reported being warned before checks by Chinese authorities, allowing them to hide the swim bladders. More recently, both Mexican and Chinese authorities have tightened checks and performed raids, resulting in large confiscations and several arrests.

The totoaba is suitable for fish farming due to the relative ease of breeding it in captivity and its high growth rate. Although this mainly is done to supply the food market, tens of thousands of totoaba hatched in captivity have been released into the wild in an attempt to save the species.

Commercial trade

Commercial fishing for totoaba began in the 1920s. The catch reached  in 1943, but had fallen to only  in 1975, when Mexico protected the totoaba and banned the fishery. Anecdotal evidence suggests that totoabas were very abundant prior to the start of the commercial fishery, but no hard evidence now indicates natural population size. Recent studies indicate that the totoaba population has stabilized at a low level, perhaps a bit larger than when the commercial fishery was banned in 1975. Totoabas are still caught as bycatch in fishing for other finned fish and for shrimp, and in illegal fishing for totoaba directly. Some totoabas are illegally exported to the United States, often misidentified as white seabass.

The government of Baja California has authorized commercial raising of totoaba in fish farms. Although now done at a relatively large scale by private fish farms, much of the initial research in the captive keeping, breeding and raising of totoaba was done at the Autonomous University of Baja California.

References

External links

Totoaba. Mexfish.com. 
"Long live the totoaba". sanfelipe.com. 
History of the Totoaba. Mexfish.com. 
Gene Kira, "Sea of Cortez Fishing Gulf of California: The near-extinction of the species came with stunning rapidity". Western Outdoor News.

Sciaenidae
Monotypic fish genera
Fish of the Gulf of California
Endemic fish of Mexico
Fish described in 1890
Taxa named by Charles Henry Gilbert